The British Rail Class 89 is a prototype electric locomotive. Only one was built, in 1986, by British Rail Engineering Limited's Crewe Works. It was used on test-trains on both the West Coast and East Coast Main Lines. The locomotive was fitted with advanced power control systems and developed more than 6,000 bhp (4,500 kW). After being withdrawn in 1992, it was returned to service in 1996, before being again withdrawn in 2000. As of January 2021, it is in the final stages of an overhaul that will return it to the main line.

Design
The Class 89 locomotive was designed by Brush Traction, Loughborough to meet a specification issued by British Rail. BR subsequently changed the requirements of this specification, but not before Brush had committed to building the prototype locomotive.

The locomotive has six DC traction motors. The main armature current for all the motors is fed from a common thyristor drive, with each motor having an independent field current controller. The field current controllers comprise a two quadrant chopper inside a thyristor bridge. The bipolar transistor based choppers provide a fast fine control of motor torque for electric braking and slip control, while the thyristor bridge is used to invert the field current polarity.

History

The specification for the locomotive was laid out in mid 1981, which then went out to tender in April 1982. The contract to build the locomotive was awarded to Brush in June 1983, with BREL Crewe as the nominated subcontractor and delivery planned for September 1985.

The locomotive was built at British Rail Engineering Limited's Crewe Works in 1986, emerging and being initially delivered to Derby Litchurch Lane Works on 2 October 1986. The Class 89 was then transferred by road to Brush Traction at Loughborough for static testing and commissioning. It was initially delivered in the old-style InterCity Executive livery, with no British Rail double arrows, but these were added later when British Rail bought the locomotive from Brush.

The locomotive was taken to Crewe Electric TMD on 9 February 1987. The following day, it first ran under its own power, inside the depot perimeter. The first lone run on the mainline was on 20 February 1987. On 6 March 1987, the locomotive visited the Railway Technical Centre for weighing and other tests. 89001 was moved to the Old Dalby Test Track for evaluation and pantograph tuning on 13 April 1987. The locomotive was initially allocated to Crewe Electric depot for trials along the West Coast Main Line. Main line running between Crewe, Willesden and Carlisle was performed with the BREL International rake of Mark 3 coaches, along with measurement coaches. The locomotive was later transferred to Bounds Green, for passenger services on the East Coast Main Line. In May 1988 the locomotive returned to Old Dalby for braking trials. On 22 May 1988, 89001 along with a Class 90, Class 91 and Class 150 left for Hamburg for display at the International Traffic and Transport Exhibition, returning on 17 June 1988.

On 3 July 1988, the locomotive hauled the Mallard 50th anniversary special from London King's Cross, along with the return journey. The locomotive began regular passenger service from London King's Cross to Peterborough on 15 July 1988. As the development of the ECML Electrification continued, the engine was painted into the new style InterCity Swallow livery and named Avocet, in recognition of the Royal Society for the Protection of Birds (RSPB), by Prime Minister Margaret Thatcher on 16 January 1989 at King's Cross station. After the ceremony the locomotive hauled a special train conveying the RSPB president Magnus Magnusson, along with other VIPs, to Sandy. Passenger use continued  on the ECML until 5 March 1989, a week before the Class 91s entered service on the diagrams.

89001 suffered a serious failure and was withdrawn from traffic in July 1992. At the time of its failure it was still owned by British Rail and Brush had no contractual obligation with regard to it. Additionally, having received no orders from BR in return for their design investment, there was little incentive for Brush to construct spare parts for it. BR had written off the locomotive financially as part of the ECML development; thus it was seen as surplus and of nil value as an asset. As such, the locomotive was sidelined.

It was saved for preservation at the Midland Railway Centre by a group of Brush Traction employees. During this period of ownership the locomotive appeared at every major British Rail depot open day, in a slowly deteriorating Intercity Swallow livery.

Legacy
It was hoped that the Class 89 design would be used for electric locomotives for the Channel Tunnel and some investigation was undertaken. It was also hoped the Class 89 would be a viable Class 86 replacement; however an upgraded version of the Class 87 was ordered instead, as the Class 90.

Ultimately only technology and ideas from 89001's internal design were used in the Class 9 Eurotunnel locomotives, and some similarity in electronics lives on today in the Class 92 locomotive design. Brush did eventually win the contracts to build Channel Tunnel locomotives, and similarities between these and 89001 enabled suitable spares to be constructed.

GNER ownership
In 1996 the InterCity East Coast franchise was won by the Great North Eastern Railway (GNER). Suffering from a motive power shortage, it purchased 89001 and repaired it for use on London to Leeds and Bradford services, investing £100,000 in an overhaul. It was also repainted in the GNER blue and orange livery. The locomotive returned to service in March 1997. However, in October 2000 the locomotive again suffered a major failure and was withdrawn from traffic. Its future was again in doubt, and it was laid up at Doncaster Works. It moved to Bounds Green TMD in December 2001 for use as a depot generator, before returning to Doncaster.

In December 2004 the locomotive was moved into the care of the AC Locomotive Group at Barrow Hill Engine Shed for secure storage. With the overhaul of the British Rail Class 91 fleet complete, along with the availability of Class 373 trains for lease, 89001 was seen as a one-off asset with little economic value.

Preservation

In October 2006 GNER put 89001 up for sale, with a six-week deadline for bids. The AC Locomotive Group launched an appeal and fundraising effort to save the locomotive, which was ultimately successful, and purchased it in December 2006. The locomotive was mostly complete, although a number of major components required expensive overhaul before it could run on the main line again. A thorough survey was undertaken to establish exactly what was required and costs drawn up. Cosmetic work in 2007 saw the loco return to its original InterCity Executive colour scheme. Electrical restoration work focused on repairing and/or refurbishing the items that led to the locomotive being withdrawn from service, namely the traction motors and their associated field converter electronics. The locomotive was lifted by Harry Needle Railroad Company at Barrow Hill Engine Shed in December 2010 and three traction motors were removed, including the one known to be faulty. In February 2011 these were being examined at Bowers to allow repair cost estimates to be made. Two of the field converters were removed, one being faulty, and again repair estimates were sought. Initially it was intended, as funds became available, to allow one power group (i.e. one bogie) to become fully operational.

On 30 April 2020 the locomotive was moved from Barrow Hill Engine Shed to Toton TMD to be repainted. It was outshopped in Intercity Swallow Livery. In October 2020 it was hauled to Soho TMD for testing. In December 2021, the AC Locomotive Group announced it had formed a new partnership with Locomotive Services Limited (LSL) that would see the remaining tasks in the overhaul completed and 89001 returned to the mainline. Once complete, it will operate with LSL for five years.

Models
Class 89 89001 is being made as a kit and as a ready-to-run model in OO gauge by Silver Fox Models.

In 2020, Accurascale announced their intention to manufacture a ready-to-run model in OO gauge to be sold as a Rails of Sheffield Exclusive Model.

Other uses of Class 89
Since 1989, numbers in the Class 89 range have been used to register preserved mainline-accredited diesel and electric locomotives, except shunters, on TOPS and its successor systems. These locomotives can continue to display their historic numbers, but are identified in industry data systems by their 89xxx identity.

References

Sources

Further reading

External links

AC Locomotive Group
Information and pictures of the locomotive in UK and Germany
Trials at Old Dalby of a special train for Hamburg IVA88 exhibition
More photos of the trip to Germany and back
The Class 89 on trial at the Old Dalby test track
The Class 89 on test

89
Brush Traction locomotives
Co-Co locomotives
Individual locomotives of Great Britain
25 kV AC locomotives
Standard gauge locomotives of Great Britain
Railway locomotives introduced in 1987
Co′Co′ electric locomotives of Europe